The Leeds municipal elections were held on Thursday 14 May 1954, with one third of the council up for election.

Despite a further swing away from Labour to the Conservatives of 3.7%, leaving both parties neck and neck in votes, Labour continued on to their third and final gains unabated in the wards of Armley, Blenheim, Bramley, Cross Gates, Stanningley, Westfield, and Woodhouse, comfortably winning the majority of seats. The swing however helped the Conservatives to hold on to Wortley, unlike previous years. As such Labour doubled its majority on the council as part of a victorious night on the whole for them. Turnout for the election sunk below the 40% mark for the first time in the post-war period, to 39.2%.

Election result

The result had the following consequences for the total number of seats on the council after the elections:

Ward results

References

1954 English local elections
1954
1950s in Leeds